Akjoujt Airport  is an airport serving the town of Akjoujt in Mauritania. A second runway (03/21) is centerline marked, but has structures built on it.

See also
Transport in Mauritania

References

 OurAirports - Mauritania
  Great Circle Mapper - Akjoujt
 Akjoujt
 Google Earth

External links

Airports in Mauritania